Dubey & Schaldenbrand is a luxury watch company headquartered in La Chaux-de-Fonds in Switzerland. The company produces  small quantities of Automatic quartz watches and mechanical watches.

Dubey & Schaldenbrand was founded in 1946 by Georges Dubey and René Schaldenbrand. In 1995, Cinette Robert revived the company.  She used a movement collection that she had amassed during the 1970s and early 1980s. Dubey & Schaldenbrand recases each movement according to the era when it was created. Dubey & Schaldenbrand designs rapidly found a niche with watch collectors.

References

External links 
 Official Dubey & Schaldenbrand Site

Watch brands